Iquique Province is one of two provinces in the northern Chilean region of Tarapacá. Its capital is the port city of Iquique.

History
Until October 2007, the Province of Iquique was composed of 7 communes: Alto Hospicio, Camina, Colchane, Huara, Iquique, Pica and Pozo Almonte, but since then, with the creation of the Region of Arica and Parinacota, much of the province, specifically the municipalities of Huara, Camina, Colchane, Pozo Almonte and Pica, was transferred administratively to Tamarugal Province, leaving Iquique Province consists of two communes.

Geography and demography
Between the 1992 and 2002 censuses, the population grew by 30.8% (50,959 persons).

Administration
As a province, Iquique is a second-level administrative division of Chile, which is further divided into two communes (comunas): the capital Iquique and its suburb Alto Hospicio. The province is administered by the presidentially appointed regional delegate.

References

 
Provinces of Tarapacá Region
Provinces of Chile